Youri Pieter Regeer (born 18 August 2003) is a Dutch professional footballer who plays as a right-back or midfielder for Ajax.

Career statistics

Honours
Ajax
 Eredivisie: 2021–22

References

External links
 Profile at the AFC Ajax website

2003 births
Living people
Footballers from Haarlem
Dutch footballers
Netherlands youth international footballers
Association football midfielders
Rijnsburgse Boys players
ADO Den Haag players
AFC Ajax players
Jong Ajax players
Eerste Divisie players
Eredivisie players